Thielen is a surname. Notable people with the surname include:

Adam Thielen, American football player
Cynthia Thielen (born 1933), American politician
Friedrich Thielen (1916–1993), German politician
Hugo Thielen (born 1946), German journalist. author and editor
Jan Philips van Thielen (1618–1667), Flemish painter
Karl-Heinz Thielen (born 1940), German football player
Rob Thielen (born 1961), Dutch businessman

German-language surnames
Dutch-language surnames